Angel D'Meza (1877-1954) was a Cuban baseball pitcher in the Cuban League. He played from 1902 to 1908 with several teams, including Fe, Almendares, San Francisco, Azul, and Habana.

References

External links

  and Seamheads

1877 births
1954 deaths
Azul (baseball) players
Almendares (baseball) players
Habana players
San Francisco (baseball) players
Cuban baseball players
Cuban League players